The Tablas fantail (Rhipidura sauli) is a fantail endemic to the Philippines on Tablas Island. Until recently, it was considered conspecific with the blue-headed fantail and Visayan fantail. It is threatened by habitat loss.

Description 
EBird describes the bird as "A medium-sized, long-tailed bird of lowland forest on Tablas. Dull blue on the head, chest, back, and shoulder with some paler blue streaking on the chest and crown. Has a buff belly, a rufous lower back, rump, outer tail feathers, and wing, and a dark wing edge and dark central tail feathers. Tail often held cocked and fanned while foraging. Similar to Black-naped Monarch, but Tablas Fantail has a rufous rump and tail. Voice includes single nasal “jep” notes given at intervals or speeded up into a rapid series." 

It is differentiated from the  blue-headed fantail and Visayan fantail with its darker brown belly.

Habitat and Conservation Status 
The species inhabits tropical moist lowland primary forest in areas with mature closed-canopy forest. It is believed to be less tolerant to habitat disturbances compared to  close relatives the Blue-headed fantail and Visayan fantail.

The IUCN Red List classifies this bird as vulnerable  with population estimates of 2,500 to 9,999 mature individuals. This species' main threat is habitat loss with wholesale clearance of forest habitats as a result of legal and illegal logging, and conversion into farmlands through Slash-and-burn and other methods.The species does not occur at high density even within the little remaining forest cover on Tablas:

Mt Palaupau serves as a watershed for Tablas Island.

There are no species specific conservation programs going on at the moment but conservation actions proposed include more species surveys to better understand habitat and population. initiate education and awareness campaigns to raise the species's profile and instill pride in locals. Lobby for protection of remaining forest and assess feasibility of reforestation projects,

References

Sánchez-González, L.A., and R.G. Moyle. 2011. Molecular systematic and species limits in the Philippine fantails (Aves: Rhipidura). Molecular Phylogenetics and Evolution 61: 290–299.

External links
Image at ADW

Tabias fantail
Endemic birds of the Philippines
Fauna of Romblon
Tabias fantail
Tabias fantail